Mile High is a British television show about airline employees.

Mile High may also refer to:

 Mile High (album), by Kottonmouth Kings, 2012
 Mile High (novel), by Richard Condon, 1969
 "Mile High" (song), by James Blake featuring Travis Scott and Metro Boomin, 2019
 The Illinois, also called Mile High Illinois, a proposed supertall skyscraper by Frank Lloyd Wright
 Mile-High Tower, a supertall skyscraper to be built in Saudi Arabia

Related to Denver and Colorado
 Denver, the "Mile High City" (elevation 5,280 feet, or one mile)
 Mile High Stadium, in Denver, former home of the Denver Broncos football team 
 Empower Field at Mile High, current home of the Denver Broncos football team
 Empower Field at Mile High station, a light rail station at the stadium
 The "Mile High Salute" of Broncos player Terrell Davis
 Mile High Comics in Denver
 Mile High Newspapers in Golden, Colorado

Other uses
 Denver and the Mile High Orchestra, a Christian jazz group

See also
 Miles High, a 1981 album by John Miles
 Mile High Club (disambiguation)